The following are the national records in athletics in France maintained by France's national athletics federation – Fédération française d'athlétisme (FFA).

Outdoor 

Key to tables:

+ = en route to a longer distance

h = hand timing

Mx = mark was made in a mixed race

a = automatic timing but hundredths not known

A = affected by altitude

NWI = no wind information

Men

Women

Mixed

Indoor

Men

Women

Notes

References
General
French Athletics Records 8 February 2023 updated
Specific

External links
FFA web site

French
Records
Athletics
Athletics